Nicolas Höfler (born 9 March 1990) is a German professional footballer who plays as a defensive midfielder for Bundesliga club SC Freiburg.

Career
Born in Überlingen, Höfler joined SC Freiburg in 2005 and spent three years in the youth team and a further three in the reserves, before joining 2. Bundesliga side Erzgebirge Aue on a two-year loan in July 2011. He made his debut a month later, as a substitute for Guido Koçer in a 1–1 draw with Eintracht Braunschweig.

References

External links

1990 births
Living people
People from Überlingen
Sportspeople from Tübingen (region)
Footballers from Baden-Württemberg
German footballers
Association football midfielders
Bundesliga players
2. Bundesliga players
SC Freiburg players
SC Freiburg II players
FC Erzgebirge Aue players
SC Pfullendorf players